Skjærvøya are two connected islands in the municipality of Osen in Trøndelag county, Norway. There are about 20 people living on the islands.

See also
List of islands of Norway

References

Islands of Trøndelag
Osen